Roy Smith (August 6, 1944 – February 26, 2004) is a former NASCAR driver and part of a Victoria-era racing family. His brother Al and his son Gary also had raced.

Career
Smith raced the majority of his career in Winston West, winning four championships (1980–82, 1988), although he made three stand-alone Winston Cup starts, all in the Daytona 500.

His official NASCAR Sprint Cup Series record shows 26 starts as the other 23 starts were in combination races were Cup/West races.  Until 1998, when NASCAR aligned the Winston West Series with the Busch North Series, all Winston Cup races in California or Arizona (along with the 1994 Brickyard 400) were declared combination races where NASCAR could feature both regular "East Coast" (Cup) drivers racing with the West Coast (West) drivers (a similar move was used in the Busch Grand National and Busch North Series races in the Northeast at the time).  For West Series drivers, they were awarded points for their series compared to other West Series drivers, and also scored an official Cup start, but not charged with one of the five starts for Rookie of the Year in Cup. 

In the Cup Series, He had four finishes in the top ten, including the 1982 Daytona 500, and no wins. Smith was inducted in the West Coast Stock Car Hall of Fame in 2002.

See also
List of Canadians in NASCAR

References

External links
 

1944 births
2004 deaths
Racing drivers from British Columbia
Sportspeople from Victoria, British Columbia
NASCAR drivers
Canadian racing drivers